Kevin Francis Joyce (born June 27, 1951) is a retired American basketball player.

A 6'3" guard born in Bayside, New York, Joyce played at the University of South Carolina. During the 1971 ACC Tournament championship game, he out-jumped North Carolina's 6'10" Lee Dedmon with seconds left to tap the ball to Tom Owens. who made a lay-up to complete a dramatic come-from-behind victory.

Joyce played at the 1972 Summer Olympics as a member of the United States national basketball team, who lost a highly controversial final game to the Soviet Union. The American team did not accept the silver medals. He later played professionally in the American Basketball Association as a member of the Indiana Pacers, San Diego Sails and Kentucky Colonels.

References

External links
 
  at DatabaseOlympics.com
 SC Athletic History as gamecocksonline.cstv.com

1951 births
Living people
All-American college men's basketball players
American men's basketball players
Archbishop Molloy High School alumni
Basketball players at the 1972 Summer Olympics
Basketball players from New York City
Golden State Warriors draft picks
Guards (basketball)
Indiana Pacers players
Kentucky Colonels players
Medalists at the 1972 Summer Olympics
Olympic silver medalists for the United States in basketball
Parade High School All-Americans (boys' basketball)
San Diego Sails players
South Carolina Gamecocks men's basketball players
United States men's national basketball team players
Sportspeople from Queens, New York